Sefaria is an online open source, free content, digital library of Jewish texts. It was founded in 2011 by former Google project manager Brett Lockspeiser and journalist-author Joshua Foer. Calling itself "a living library of Jewish texts", Sefaria relies on volunteers to add texts and translations. The site provides cross-references and interconnections between different texts. Hebrew, Aramaic, and Judeo-Arabic texts are provided under a free license in the original and in translation. The website also provides a tool for creating source sheets.

Sefaria is a non-profit organization. The technology is maintained by a team of 18 engineers. According to its chief data officer Lev Israel in 2019, the service received 250,000 unique visitors monthly.

Etymology 
The name Sefaria derives from the words sefer, or "book", and sifria ("library") in Hebrew.

History 
Sefaria was originally founded in 2011 by journalist Joshua Foer and Brett Lockspeiser, a former product manager at Google. The site's first beta was released in 2012. The company was formally incorporated in 2013, with funding from the Natan Fund, Jonathan and Tamar Koschitzky, and the Jim Joseph Foundation. By 2015, twelve apps used Sefaria's API and database. Also in 2015, Sefaria reached a deal to use Urim Publications' translations of the Tanakh and commentaries.

Sefaria's website received a major redesign in 2016, alongside the release of new apps for smartphones running iOS and Android, and a complete English translation of Rashi's commentary on the Torah. By this point, over a dozen people were part of the website's staff. Sefaria reached a major milestone in 2017, with the release of the William Davidson Talmud. In 2020, the site announced a pilot program to introduce its model to some secular works such as American constitutional studies. 

In 2021, Sefaria announced a major addition of a complete translation of Ibn Ezra's Torah commentaries provided by H. Norman Strickman and Arthur M. Silver, one of the only resources to have a complete translation of these works in English. In 2019, Lockspeiser was listed among Forward Magazine's 50 under 50 for this advancement in Torah technology.

Content 
Sefaria has a vast library of Jewish text, including Tanakh, Talmud, and Jewish prayers alongside sources in philosophy, mysticism, Jewish law, and newer works. Sefaria's content comes from a variety of sources. Books in the public domain are scanned and processed by OCR software, which a team corrects and formats. Other online sources such as On Your Way are also used. Some publishers have also provided works directly to Sefaria.

Sefaria also produces visualizations of the texts in its corpus, such as illustrating connections between the Tanakh and Talmud.

Translations 
Some works, such as Tanakh and the Talmud, feature English translations. These are either crowdsourced, provided by publishers, or in the public domain.

Features

Links 
Many works are linked with their respective commentaries. For example, clicking on a verse in Tanakh will open a window on the side, allowing the user to open a commentary on that verse.

Source Sheets 
Sefaria's Source Sheet Builder allows users to create a page with source text from Sefaria. Source Sheets can be made public, and available for other users, or can be downloaded as a PDF and printed.

References

External links
 
 Sefaria-Export - Texts exported from Sefaria's database.

Internet properties established in 2011
American digital libraries
Jewish libraries
Judaism websites
Judaism software
IOS software
Free and open-source Android software